Colne Valley is an unparished area in the metropolitan borough of Kirklees, West Yorkshire, England.  Colne Valley ward contains over 480 listed buildings that are recorded in the National Heritage List for England.  Of these, twelve are listed at Grade II*, the middle of the three grades, and the others are at Grade II, the lowest grade.

This list contains the listed buildings in the central part of the ward, in which the largest settlement is the village of Slaithwaite, and it includes the smaller settlements and districts of Clough Head, Hill Top, Holt Head, and Lower Holme.  Apart from the settlements, this part of the ward is almost completely rural.  A high proportion of the listed buildings are farmhouses and farm buildings, almost all constructed in stone with roofs of stone slate, and containing mullioned windows.  During the 19th century, the ward was involved in the textile industry, and the listed buildings associated with this are former weavers' houses and mills.  The River Colne and the Huddersfield Narrow Canal pass through this part of the ward, and the listed buildings associated with the canal are two bridges and a milestone.  The other listed buildings include houses and cottages and associated structures, churches and chapels and associated structures, a road bridge, public houses, a lockup,  former schools, two railway viaducts, and a mile post.

The listed buildings in the other parts of the ward can be found at Listed buildings in Colne Valley (eastern area) and Listed buildings in Colne Valley (western area)



Key

Buildings

References

Citations

Sources

Lists of listed buildings in West Yorkshire
Listed